Marcelo Torrealba (born 6 May 1996) is a Chilean professional rugby union player. He currently plays as a scrum half for Austin Gilgronis in Major League Rugby (MLR) and for Chile internationally.

References

External links

1996 births
Living people
Chilean rugby union players
Rugby sevens players at the 2019 Pan American Games
Pan American Games competitors for Chile
Rugby union scrum-halves
Chile international rugby union players
Austin Gilgronis players
Selknam (rugby union) players
Sportspeople from Santiago